The Church of Jesus Christ of Latter-day Saints in Nevada refers to the Church of Jesus Christ of Latter-day Saints (LDS Church) and its members in Nevada. Nevada has the 7th most church members of any U.S. state, and the fourth-highest percentage of members. The LDS Church is the 2nd largest denomination in Nevada, behind the Roman Catholic Church.

History

In 1855, 30 men were called to establish a mission at the Meadows in southern Nevada.

Gordon B. Hinckley dedicated the Las Vegas Nevada Temple in sessions held December 16–18, 1989 and more than 30,000 Latter-day Saints attended the dedicatory services.

County Statistics
List of LDS Church adherents in each county as of 2010 according to the Association of Religion Data Archives: Note: Each county adherent count reflects meetinghouse location of congregation and not by location of residence. Census count reflects location of residence which may skew percent of population where adherents reside in a different county as their congregational meetinghouse.

Stakes

Stakes are located in Carson City, Elko (2), Ely, Fallon (2), Henderson (7), Las Vegas (19), Logandale, Mesquite (2), North Las Vegas, Panaca, Reno (3), Sparks (2) and Winnemucca.

Missions
On July 1, 1975, the Nevada Las Vegas Mission was organized from the Arizona Tempe and California Sacramento missions. Due to growth of missionary work in the area, the Nevada Las Vegas Mission split, creating the Nevada Las Vegas West Mission. On July 1, 2012, the Las Vegas and Las Vegas West Missions were realigned, and the Nevada Reno Mission was created.

In addition to these missions, the Utah St George Mission serves the Mesquite Nevada Stake.

Temples

Nevada currently has 2 temples in operation, 1 under construction, and 1 announced.

Communities
Latter-day Saints had a significant role in establishing and settling communities within the "Mormon Corridor", including the following in Nevada:

Barclay
Bunkerville
Crystal Springs
Genoa
Las Vegas
Lund
Mesquite
Metropolis
Moapa Valley
Muddy River
Overton
Panaca
St. Joseph
St. Thomas
West Point

Notable Latter-day Saints in Nevada
Brian Crane - Creator of award-winning Pickles comic strip.
Brandon Flowers - 10x UK Albums Chart-topper, Grammy Award Nominee
Lloyd D. George - U.S. District Court Judge, Federal Courthouse Namesake
Jim Gibbons (American politician) - Governor of Nevada
 Andy Hafen - Mayor of Henderson
Cresent Hardy - U.S. Representative from Nevada, 4th district
Dean Heller- U.S. Senator from Nevada
Mark Hutchison - Lieutenant Governor of Nevada
Gladys Knight - Rock N Roll Hall of Fame Inductee, 7x Grammy Award Winner, Kennedy Center Honoree
John Jay Lee - Mayor of North Las Vegas
Harry Reid - U.S. Senate Majority Leader
Dan Reynolds - Songwriters Hall of Fame Inductee, 1x Grammy Award Winner

See also

Mormon Station State Historic Park
Old Las Vegas Mormon Fort State Historic Park
State of Deseret
Religion in Nevada

References

Further reading

.

External links
 Newsroom Facts and Statistics (Nevada)
 ComeUntoChrist.org Latter-day Saints Visitor site
 The Church of Jesus Christ of Latter-day Saints Official site

Latter Day Saint movement in Nevada